The Ninth Wisconsin Legislature convened from January 9, 1856, to March 31, 1856, in regular session, and re-convened from September 3, 1856, to October 14, 1856.

This was a pivotal legislative session in the fall of the Democratic Party in Wisconsin and the rise of the new Republican Party—the Republicans would dominate the state government for most of the next 100 years.  The start of the session saw the dispute over the 1855 Wisconsin gubernatorial election, in which the Democratic incumbent governor, William A. Barstow, was forced to resign from office three months into this term after the Wisconsin Supreme Court threw out a number of apparently fraudulent votes.  

Before he left office however, Barstow was involved in an extensive railroad bribery scandal, which ultimately also implicated his Republican challenger, Coles Bashford, and a huge portion of the members of the 9th Wisconsin Legislature.  The scheme saw railroad promoters, led by Milwaukee mayor Byron Kilbourn, bribing legislators and other state officials with railroad company bonds and stock in exchange for securing land grants for the La Crosse and Milwaukee Railroad route.  An 1858 investigation found $900,000 worth of bribes had been paid (nearly $33,000,000 adjusted for inflation), averaging $10,000 per official.  Although legislators from both parties received the corrupt bonds, Democrats ultimately took the bulk of the blame.

Senators representing even-numbered districts were newly elected for this session and were serving the first year of a two-year term.  Assemblymembers were elected to a one-year term.  Assemblymembers and even-numbered senators were elected in the general election of November 6, 1855.  Senators representing odd-numbered districts were serving the second year of their two-year term, having been elected in the general election held on November 7, 1854.

Major events

 January 7, 1856: Resulting from a dispute over the 1855 gubernatorial election, both Coles Bashford and William A. Barstow were sworn in as Governor of Wisconsin in separate ceremonies.
 January 15, 1856: Assemblymember William Brunquest, representing Oconto, Outagamie, and Waupaca counties, resigned his seat after it was demonstrated that he had actually lost his election to Louis Bostedo.
 March 21, 1856: William A. Barstow officially withdrew his claim to the Governorship, leaving Lieutenant Governor Arthur MacArthur as Acting Governor.
 March 24, 1856: The Wisconsin Supreme Court issued its decision in the case Atty. Gen. ex rel. Bashford v. Barstow, ruling that Coles Bashford had won the 1855 gubernatorial election.
 March 25, 1856: Coles Bashford was sworn in as the 5th Governor of Wisconsin.  Arthur MacArthur returned to his previous office as Lieutenant Governor.
 November 4, 1856: James Buchanan elected 15th President of the United States.

Major legislation

 March 20, 1856: Act to annex a part of the county of Dodge to the county of Jefferson, 1856 Act 27
 March 22, 1856: Joint Resolution in relation to Islands in the Mississippi river, 1856 Joint Resolution 2
 March 28, 1856: Act to define the boundaries of the county of Winnebago, 1856 Act 45
 March 29, 1856: Act to divide the county of Portage and erect the county of Wood, 1856 Act 54
 March 31, 1856: Joint Resolution of the Senate and Assembly of the State of Wisconsin to the United States, in relation to the removal of the Stockbridge Indians, 1856 Joint Resolution 4
 March 31, 1856: Act to set apart and incorporate the county of Burnette, 1856 Act 94
 September 16, 1856: Joint Resolution in relation to the Stockbridge and Munsee Indians, 1856 Joint Resolution 5
 September 30, 1856: Act to apportion and district anew the Members of the Senate and Assembly of the State of Wisconsin, 1856 Act 109.  Expanded the Wisconsin Senate to 30 members, and the Assembly to 97.
 October 6, 1856: Act to organize the county of Eau Claire, 1856 Act 114
 October 14, 1856: Act to regulate the boundaries of La Crosse, Jackson and Monroe Counties, 1856 Act 145

Party summary

Senate summary

Assembly summary

Sessions
 1st Regular session: January 9, 1856 – March 31, 1856
 2nd Regular session: September 3, 1856 – October 14, 1856

Leaders

Senate leadership
 President of the Senate: Arthur MacArthur, Sr., Lieutenant Governor
 President pro tempore: Louis P. Harvey

Assembly leadership
 Speaker of the Assembly: William Hull

Members

Members of the Senate
Members of the Wisconsin Senate for the Ninth Wisconsin Legislature:

Members of the Assembly
Members of the Assembly for the Ninth Wisconsin Legislature:

Employees

Senate employees
 Chief Clerk: Byron Paine
 Sergeant-at-Arms: Joseph Baker

Assembly employees
 Chief Clerk: James Armstrong
 Sergeant-at-Arms: Egbert Moseley

References

External links

1856 in Wisconsin
Wisconsin
Wisconsin legislative sessions